Sometimes They Come Back... for More is the second straight-to-video sequel to Sometimes They Come Back. The video was directed by Daniel Zelik Berk and released in 1998.

Plot
The U.S. military has a secret illegal mining operation in Antarctica. When one of the personnel stationed at the base goes on a rampage, two military operatives, Capt. Sam Cage (Clayton Rohner) and Maj. Callie O'Grady (Chase Masterson) search the base by rappelling in from helicopter during stormy weather. They discover two survivors, medical officer Capt. Jennifer Wells (Faith Ford) and technical officer Lieut. Brian Shebanski (Max Perlich). The base radio is mysteriously smashed.

Going into the mining area of the base, Capt. Cage sees what appears to be another survivor and starts a chase through the corridors, taking an elevator down to the second level. When Maj. O'Grady collapses because of the gases in the mine he takes her to an elevator, only to discover they are actually on the fourth level. Back in the main compound they discover that a body they had found in the snow has now moved and is gone. They find dead and dying personnel, and a book about conjuring the Devil. More bodies disappear when nobody's looking, and reappear later as lurching menaces. Soon Jennifer and Sam find themselves the only ones still alive, fighting the undead and their diabolical master.

Cast
 Clayton Rohner as Captain Sam Cage 
 Faith Ford as Dr. Jennifer Wells 
 Max Perlich as Lieutenant Brian Shebanski 
 Chase Masterson as Major Callie O'Grady 
 Damian Chapa as Dr. Karl Schilling 
 Jennifer O'Dell as Mary 
 Michael Stadvec as Captain Robert Reynolds 
 Stephen Hart as Major Frank Whittaker 
 Douglas Stoup as Lieutenant Baines 
 Frank Ceglia as Soldier In Bar

See also
 Project Iceworm - a top-secret United States Army program during the Cold War to build a network of mobile nuclear missile launch sites under the Greenland ice sheet.

External links
 
 
 

1999 films
American supernatural horror films
Demons in film
Direct-to-video sequel films
1998 horror films
1998 films
Films set in Antarctica
Trimark Pictures films
1990s English-language films
1990s American films